Robert Bowman (also Rob, Bob, or Bobby) may refer to:

Sports
Bob Bowman (coach) (born 1965), American swimming coach
Rob Bowman (footballer) (born 1975), English football player
Robert A. Bowman, President and CEO of MLB Advanced Media
Bob Bowman (pitcher) (1910–1972), American baseball pitcher 
Bob Bowman (outfielder) (1930–2017), American baseball outfielder

Music and entertainment
Rob Bowman (director) (born 1960), American film and TV director
Rob Bowman (music writer) (born 1957), Canadian music writer and professor of ethnomusicology
 BooG!E (born Bobby Bowman), actor known for playing T-Bo in the American teen sitcom iCarly

Other uses
Robert M. Bowman (1934–2013), former Director of Advanced Space Programs Development for the U.S. Air Force and U.S. presidential candidate
Robert M. Bowman Jr. (born 1957), American Christian theologian
Robert Bowman (journalist) ( 1940s), Canadian radio reporter
Robert Benson Bowman (1808–1882), Newcastle bookseller and entrepreneur